Barnham Mill is a tower mill at Barnham, Suffolk, England which has been converted to residential accommodation.

History
Barnham Mill was built for the Duke of Grafton in 1821. It is likely that the builder was George Bloomfield of Thelnetham. The mill was worked until 1923. By the Second World War it was derelict, with the cap reduced to the frame and the fantail missing. The mill was stripped of machinery in 1967. It was subsequently incorporated into a house built alongside.

Description

Barnham Mill is a three-storey tower mill which had four Patent sails carried on a two piece cast iron windshaft. It had a domed cap which was winded by a fantail. It had three pairs of millstones.

References

External links
Photo of converted mill

Windmills in Suffolk
Tower mills in the United Kingdom
Windmills completed in 1821
Grinding mills in the United Kingdom
Borough of St Edmundsbury
Towers completed in 1821